The 1956 Swedish speedway season was the 1956 season of motorcycle speedway in Sweden.

Individual

Individual Championship
The 1956 Swedish Individual Speedway Championship final was held on 5  October in Gothenburg. Ove Fundin won the Swedish Championship.

Team

Team Championship
Monarkerna won division 1 for the second consecutive season and were declared the winners of the Swedish Speedway Team Championship. The Monakerna team contained riders such as Olle Nygren and Ulf Ericsson.

As per the 1955 season there were just six teams that lined up for the 1956 season.

See also 
 Speedway in Sweden

References

Speedway leagues
Professional sports leagues in Sweden
Swedish
Seasons in Swedish speedway